Alocasia azlanii, the red mambo, is a species of flowering plant in the family Araceae, native to Brunei, and first described in 2016. With its red to purple patterning on and near its leaf veins, it is sometimes kept as a houseplant.

References

azlanii
House plants
Endemic flora of Brunei
Plants described in 2016